Jean Mathieu de Chazelles (24 July 1657 – 16 January 1710), French hydrographer, was born in Lyon.

He was nominated professor of hydrography at Marseilles in 1685, and in that capacity carried out various coast surveys. In 1693 he was engaged to publish a second volume of the Neptune français, which was to, include the hydrography of the Mediterranean. For this purpose he visited the Levant and Egypt. When in Egypt he measured the pyramids, and, finding that the angles formed by the sides of the largest were in the direction of the four cardinal points, he concluded that this position must have been intended, and also that the poles of the earth and meridians had not deviated since the erection of those structures. He was made a member of the Academy in 1695, and died in Paris on 16 January 1710.

The botanist and explorer Louis Feuillée was one of his pupils.

1657 births
1710 deaths
17th-century French scientists
French hydrographers
18th-century French scientists